The following is a list of notable events and releases that happened or were expected to happen in 2010 in Australian music.

Events

January
17-31 January – Big Day Out 2010 is held in Sydney, Melbourne, Perth, Adelaide and the Gold Coast, headlined by Muse and Powderfinger. Dancehall artist Beenie Man is withdrawn from the lineup by the festival organisers.

July
30 July–1 August – Splendour in the Grass 2010 is held in Woodford, Queensland, headlined by The Strokes, Pixies and Ben Harper & Relentless7.

Albums released

January
15: The Sunny Cowgirls — Summer

February
19: Eddy Current Suppression Ring — Rush to Relax
26: M-Phazes — Good Gracious

March
12: Angus & Julia Stone — Down the Way
12: Calling All Cars – Hold Hold Fire
12: MM9 – The Air Between
19: John Williamson — Absolute Greatest: 40 Years of True Blue
22: Gabriella Cilmi — Ten
26: Mantra — Power of the Spoken

April
9: Gyroscope — Cohesion
9: Katie Noonan and The Captains — Emperor's Box
9: James Reyne — TCB
16: The Bedroom Philosopher — Songs from the 86 Tram
26: John Butler Trio — April Uprising
26: Operator Please — Gloves
30: British India  — Avalanche
30: Sara Storer  — Calling Me Home: The Best of Sara Storer

May
7: Maundz — Mr. Nobody
14: Spit Syndicate — Exile
14: Dead Letter Circus – This is the Warning
21: Tame Impala — Innerspeaker
21: Deez Nuts — This One's for You
28: Catherine Britt — Catherine Britt
28: Midnight Juggernauts — The Crystal Axis

June
11: Cloud Control — Bliss Release
11: Crowded House — Intriguer
11: The Paradise Motel — Australian Ghost Story
18: The Amity Affliction – Youngbloods
18: Sia — We Are Born
18: Cola Wars — Invader
25: The Cat Empire — Cinema
25: Parkway Drive — Deep Blue

July
2: Eloqour — Charge
2: The Wilson Pickers — Shake It Down
5: Basement Birds — Basement Birds
9: Shane Howard — Goanna Dreaming
16: Erika — Sweeter Side
16: Dan Kelly  — Dan Kelly's Dream
16: Maggot Mouf — You're All Ears
16: PVT — Church With No Magic
23: Birds of Tokyo — Birds of Tokyo
23: Skryptcha — The Numbers
30: Bliss n Eso — Running On Air
30: Washington — I Believe You, Liar

August
6: Dom Mariani — Rewind and Play
13: Custom Kings — Great Escape
13: Steve Forde — Hurricane
13: Papa VS Pretty — Heavy Harm
13: The Verses — Seasons
20: Adam Brand — It's Gonna Be OK
20: Miami Horror — Illumination
20: Stan Walker — From the Inside Out
27: Children Collide — Theory of Everything

September
3: Koolism — The 'Umu
10: Little Red — Midnight Remember
10: Old Man River — Trust
10: The Tongue — Alternative Energy
17: Kasey Chambers — Little Bird
17: Dialectrix — Audio Projectile
20: Shihad — Ignite
24: The Holidays — Post Paradise

October
1: Bag Raiders — Bag Raiders
1: Lior — Tumbling into the Dawn
8: The Audreys — Sometimes the Stars
8: Stealing O'Neal — Don't Sleep
8: You Am I — You Am I

Number-ones in 2010
Record charts in Australia are published by the Australian Recording Industry Association every week.

Singles

The longest-running number-one singles in 2010 so far are Usher's "OMG" and Eminem's "Love the Way You Lie", both topping the chart for six consecutive weeks.

Albums

Susan Boyle's I Dreamed a Dream was the number-one album for eleven non-consecutive weeks of 2010.

Top 10 Singles

This is a list of singles that peaked in the Top 10 of the Australian Singles Chart during 2010. The date is when the song entered the Top 10 for the first time. Songs that were still in the top 10 at the beginning of 2010 but peaked in 2009 are listed as well. Songs that entered the top 10 in 2010 but did not peak until 2011 will be listed in List of top 10 singles in 2011 (Australia). An asterisk (*) in the "Weeks in Top 10" column shows that the song is still in the top 10 and therefore the number of weeks could change.

Notes:
  – First entered the Top 10 on 25 January 2010 where it spent 2 weeks, the song re-entered the Top 10 on 29 March 2010.
  – First entered the Top 10 on 22 February 2010 where it spent 1 week, the song re-entered the Top 10 on 29 March 2010.
  – First entered the Top 10 on 1 March 2010 where it spent 1 week, the song re-entered the Top 10 on 22 March 2010.
  – First entered the Top 10 on 17 May 2010 where it spent 1 week, the song re-entered the Top 10 on 21 June 2010.
  – First entered the Top 10 on 14 June 2010 where it spent 9 weeks, the song re-entered the Top 10 on 23 August 2010
  – First entered the Top 10 on 20 September 2010 where it spent 1 weeks, the song re-entered the Top 10 on 11 October 2010.

2009 Peaks
"I Gotta Feeling" by The Black Eyed Peas – Weeks: 21, Peak: #1 
"Tik Tok" by Kesha – Weeks: 17, Peak: #1
"Bad Romance" by Lady Gaga – Weeks: 14, Peak: #2
"Black Box" by Stan Walker – Weeks: 9, Peak #2 (#1 for 13 weeks on the download chart, and #1 for 12 weeks on the Video Hits chart)
"Starstrukk" by 3OH!3 featuring Katy Perry – Weeks: 9, Peak: #4
"Empire State of Mind" by Jay-Z and Alicia Keys – Weeks: 13, Peak #4
"Down" by Jay Sean featuring Lil Wayne – Weeks: 12, Peak: #2
"Art of Love" by Guy Sebastian featuring Jordin Sparks – Weeks: 5, Peak #8
  – First entered the Top 10 on 15 June 2009 where it spent 20 weeks, the song re-entered the Top 10 on  11 January 2010.

Entries by artist

The following table shows artists who have had the most top 10 entries in 2010. Unlike the main list, this table includes songs in the figures that reached their peak in 2009. The figures include both main artists and featured artists, while appearances on ensemble charity records are also counted for each artist.

Notes:

 – This includes appearances on both 3OH!3's single "Starstrukk" and Timbaland's single "If We Ever Meet Again".
 – This includes appearances on both Eminem's single "Love The Way You Lie" and David Guetta's single "Who's That Chick?."
 – This includes an appearance on Flo Rida's single "Club Can't Handle Me".
 – This includes appearances on both B.o.B's single "Nothin' On You" and Travie McCoy's single "Billionaire".
 – This includes appearances on both Enrique Iglesias' single "I Like It" and Usher's single "DJ Got Us Fallin' In Love".
 – This includes an appearance on Kevin Rudolf's single "I Made It (Cash Money Heroes)".

Compilations

So Fresh: The Hits of Autumn 2010 remained as the number-one compilation album for five non-consecutive weeks of 2010.

Music DVDs

Pink's Funhouse Tour: Live in Australia has reached the top spot in 2010 for ten consecutive weeks.

Video Hits Top 20 Singles Chart

The Video Hits Top 20 chart comes from Channel Ten's singles chart show, it closes every Sunday show with the week's #1 ARIA chart single. The longest-running #1 single on the Video Hits Top 20 Chart throughout 2010 so far is Stan Walker's "Black Box", topping the chart for twelve consecutive weeks of 2010.

Radio airplays

References

 
Australian music
Australia